Frida Mikaela Kinhult (born 25 September 1999) is a Swedish professional golfer. She rose to world number one in the World Amateur Golf Ranking in June 2019 and won the 2020 Symetra Tour Championship to graduate to the LPGA Tour.

Early life and amateur career
The daughter of a golf professional, Kinhult started playing the game at an early age at Skaftö Golf Club in Fiskebäckskil, on the small Swedish west coast island Skaftö with 1,400 inhabitants. Her three years older brother Marcus Kinhult became a professional golfer at 19 years of age to play on the European Tour and won the 2019 Betfred British Masters.

Kinhult has played on the Swedish national team since 2013. Representing her country, she was part of the teams winning the 2017 European Girls' Team Championship and the 2018 and 2019 European Ladies' Team Championship. She has represented Europe in the Patsy Hankins Trophy, Junior Ryder Cup, Junior Solheim Cup, and won the 2019 Vagliano Trophy. Individually, she won the Spanish International Ladies Amateur Championship in 2017 and then successfully defended her title in 2018.

In 2015, aged 15, she started in her first Ladies European Tour event, the Helsingborg Open, and two years later she finished top-10 at Andalucia Costa Del Sol Open De España Femenino. She participated in three majors as a teenager. The win of the 2017 European Girls' Team Championship exempted her from pre-qualifying for the 2018 Women's British Open. She later received an invitation to the 2019 ANA Inspiration (foregoing her spot at Augusta National Women's Amateur played the same week) and qualified for the 2019 Women's British Open.

In the fall of 2018 Kinhult moved to Tallahassee to play golf at Florida State University. As a freshman, she won two tournaments and set the Seminoles' single-season scoring average record of 70.66, was a WGCA First Team All-American, shared ACC Player of the Year honors with Wake Forest's Jennifer Kupcho, and was named both ACC and WGCA Freshman of the Year. During her year and a half at Florida State, Kinhult was a three-time winner and won the 2019 Arnold Palmer Cup.

In June 2019, she reached number one in the World Amateur Golf Ranking.

Professional career
Kinhult turned professional in December 2019 after qualifying for the Symetra Tour. She won her first professional tournament at the 2020 Symetra Tour Championship, earning LPGA Tour membership for 2021 and a spot in the 2020 U.S. Women's Open in the process.

Kinhult earned her card for the 2022 LPGA Tour through qualifying school.

Amateur wins
2017 Spanish International Ladies Amateur Championship
2018 Spanish International Ladies Amateur Championship, Jim West Challenge 
2019 Darius Rucker Intercollegiate, Schooner Fall Classic

Source:

Professional wins

Symetra Tour wins

Results in LPGA majors

CUT = missed the half-way cut
NT = no tournament

Team appearances
Amateur
Junior Vagliano Trophy: (representing the Continent of Europe): 2015 (winners)
Patsy Hankins Trophy (representing Europe): 2016, 2018
Junior Ryder Cup (representing Europe): 2016
Junior Solheim Cup (representing Europe): 2017
Vagliano Trophy (representing the Continent of Europe): 2019 (winners)
European Girls' Team Championship (representing Sweden): 2015, 2016, 2017 (winners), 2018
Espirito Santo Trophy (representing Sweden): 2018
European Ladies' Team Championship (representing Sweden): 2018 (winners), 2019 (winners)
Arnold Palmer Cup (representing the International team): 2019 (winners)

References

External links

Frida Kinhult on the Florida State Seminoles official site

Swedish female golfers
Florida State Seminoles women's golfers
LPGA Tour golfers
Sportspeople from Västra Götaland County
People from Lysekil Municipality
1999 births
Living people